Walerian Wilczogórski was a Roman Catholic prelate who served as Auxiliary Bishop of Włocławek (1652–?).

Biography
On 13 May 1652, Walerian Wilczogórski was appointed during the papacy of Pope Innocent X as Auxiliary Bishop of Włocławek and Titular Bishop of Margarita.
In 1652, he was consecrated bishop by Nicolas Albert Gniewosz de Olexow, Bishop of Włocławek. 
It is uncertain how long he served; the next auxiliary bishop of record was Stanisław Domaniewski who was appointed in 1653.

References

External links and additional sources
 (for Chronology of Bishops) 
 (for Chronology of Bishops)  
 (for Chronology of Bishops) 
 (for Chronology of Bishops)  

17th-century Roman Catholic bishops in the Polish–Lithuanian Commonwealth
Bishops appointed by Pope Innocent X